Omer Dzonlagic (born 25 May 1995) is a Swiss footballer of Bosnia and Herzegovina descent who plays for Thun.

Career
Dzonlagic was loaned out from Thun to Kriens on 11 January 2019 for the rest of the season.

References

External links
Profile on SC Kriens

1995 births
Swiss people of Bosnia and Herzegovina descent
Living people
Swiss men's footballers
Association football midfielders
FC Bern players
FC Thun players
SC Kriens players
2. Liga Interregional players
Swiss 1. Liga (football) players
Swiss Super League players
Swiss Challenge League players